Clam River may refer to:

 Clam River (Michigan)
 Clam River (Wisconsin)